Shelley Marie Hack (born July 6, 1947) is an American actress, model, producer, and political activist. She is best known as the face of Revlon's Charlie perfume from the mid-1970s until the early 1980s, and for her role as Tiffany Welles in the fourth season of Charlie's Angels (1979–80).

Early life
Hack was born in Greenwich, Connecticut on July 6, 1947, the eldest of six children. Her father was a Wall Street financial analyst, and her mother was a former Conover model. She graduated from Greenwich Academy and Smith College, where she spent her junior year studying archeology at the University of Sydney.

Career
Hack began her career as a teen fashion model; her first job was the cover of Glamour magazine. Later she became the face of Revlon's "Charlie" perfume from the mid-1970s until the early 1980s. Life proclaimed her one of the "million-dollar faces" in the beauty industry able to negotiate previously unheard-of lucrative and exclusive deals with giant cosmetics companies, were instantly recognizable, and whose names became known to the general public. Hack ranked among a handful of 1970s "supermodels".

Hack's feature-film debut was a bit part in Woody Allen's Academy Award-winning film Annie Hall (1977), as "Street Stranger". In Hack's second film appearance, she was the leading lady in the Joe Brooks romance drama If Ever I See You Again ("A bomb", she admitted). Shortly thereafter she was cast as Kate Jackson's replacement on the television series Charlie's Angels playing the sophisticated character Tiffany Welles for one season (1979–1980). She beat out many competitors for the role, including Michelle Pfeiffer and Barbara Bach. Although there was an initial rise in the ratings (her debut episode was number one in the weekly Nielson ratings), they began to decline. Responding to the fallen ratings, ABC released Hack from her contract in February 1980. A statement later issued by Spelling-Goldberg read: "When she signed her contract for the series, Miss Hack had a personal agreement that she could review her continuation with the show at the end of her first season since series television represented an enormous change in her career and lifestyle", implying that Hack was included in the decision to exit Charlie's Angels. In an interview, Hack said, "They can say I didn't work out, but it isn't true. What happened was a network war. A business decision was made. Change the timeslot or bring on some new publicity. How to get publicity? A new Angel hunt. Who is the obvious person to replace? I am — the new kid on the block." Hack later said she "never expected to be there more than a year and I wasn't. I did my year and I moved on."

Hack thereafter played a variety of starring and supporting roles. She starred with Annette O'Toole and Meredith Baxter Birney in Vanities (1981), a television production of the comedy-drama stage play about the lives, loves and friendship of three Texas cheerleaders starting from high school to post-college graduation; it aired as a part of Standing Room Only, a series on the premium-television channel HBO. She received positive reviews for her portrayal of Cathy Long in Martin Scorsese's film The King of Comedy (1983). She had leading roles in two cult films: the comedy-horror film, Troll (1986) and the horror film The Stepfather (1987). She was also a regular on two short-lived TV series of the 1980s, Cutter to Houston (1983) and Jack and Mike (1986–87). She had several more notable appearances in film and television and on stage. Additionally, Hack narrated the audiobook The Lord of Hawkfell Island, for which AudioFile stated "Shelley Hack's mellifluous voice brings this Viking tale alive."

In 1987, Hack, a former smoker, was named the national chairperson for the National Lung Association's and American Medical Association's campaign to educate young women on the dangers of cigarette smoking.

Hack completed a master's degree in business administration from New York Institute of Technology and shortly afterwards (unofficially) retired from acting.

In October 2000, appearing as herself, Hack returned to the Charlie's Angels Townsend Agency office as a guest host on Biography, which featured profiles of several Charlie's Angels stars during '"Hello Angels Week". In January 2008, Hack appeared on The Oprah Winfrey Show. The episode, "Classic Americana", featured Hack as Revlon's Charlie perfume model in a 1976 television ad with Bobby Short at the piano. "It was a time when women were changing", Hack said; "women looked at [the ad] and said 'I want to be like that.'" Additionally, referring to the Revlon Charlie commercials and Charlie's Angels, she said, "I was lucky. There were two things I was in that were about making women feel a little more empowered."

Hack and her husband Harry Winer are co-presidents of the production company Smash Media, which develops and produces content for motion pictures, television and new media.

Political Activism
Shelley Hack became a voting registration and polling station supervisor in the 1997 elections in Bosnia-Herzegovina and produced the first-ever televised presidential debates there as well. She also produced the debates in Sarajevo, Mostar, and the two in Banja Luka. In 1997, Hack founded the Shelley Hack Media Consultancy (SHMC), where she worked with the largest media conglomerate in Eastern Europe, primarily focused on the television sector for 10 years, creating ethnically diverse television programs in Eastern Europe. She established herself as a media consultant for pre- and post-conflict countries. Among her duties was to help spread independent media such as newspapers, radio and television, citing the fact that with autocratic governments, the population is often fed state television, which delivers biased content. Additionally, she became a member of the Pacific Council on International Policy (PCIP).

Personal life
Hack has been married to Harry Winer since 1990. The couple have one child, daughter Devon Rose Winer (b. 1990).

Filmography

Film

Television

Stage

Discography/Audio book

Home video

Production

References
 The Real Mad Men of Advertising S01-E03-The 1970s on YouTube

External links
 
 
 

American film actresses
American television actresses
Living people
Actresses from Greenwich, Connecticut
Female models from New York (state)
Smith College alumni
20th-century American actresses
American female models
21st-century American women
1947 births